Gemmula kieneri is a species of sea snail, a marine gastropod mollusk in the family Turridae, the turrids.

Its mineralized tissue is made up of calcium carbonate. One may find it in a water depth of 50m (min) to 346m (max).

Subspecies
 † Gemmula kieneri ryuktjuensis MacNeil, 1960
 † Gemmula kieneri woodwardi (Martin, 1884)

Description
The length of this robust, fusiform shell varies between 26.2 mm and 73 mm.

AWB Powell (1964) pointed out that this species is very similar to Gemmula speciosa (Reeve, 1842)

Distribution
This marine species occurs off Papua New Guinea, in the East China Sea and South China Sea, Nansha Islands; off Japan and the Philippines; off Queensland, Australia.

References

 Doumet, E. (1840) Pleurotoma in Mollusques. Magasin de Zoologie. Series II year II: pl. 10+2 pp; pl. 11+ 2 pp
 Reeve, L.A. (1843-46) Monograph of the Genus Pleurotoma. Conchologia Iconica, vol. 1, Pls. I –XL
 Powell, A.W.B. (1964) The family Turridae in the Indo-Pacific. Part 1. The subfamily Turrinae. Indo-Pacific Mollusca, 1, 227–346
 Powell, A.W.B. 1968. The turrid shellfish of Australian waters. Australian Natural History 1 16: 1–6
 Ladd, H.S. 1982. Cenozoic fossil mollusks from western Pacific islands; gastropods (Eulimidae and Volutidae through Terebridae). United States Geological Survey Professional Papers 1171: i-iv, pls 1-20 
 Springsteen, F.J. & Leobrera, F.M. 1986. Shells of the Philippines. Manila : Carfel Seashell Museum 377 pp., 100 pls. 
 Wilson, B. 1994. Australian marine shells. Prosobranch gastropods. Kallaroo, WA : Odyssey Publishing Vol. 2 370 pp. 
 Tucker, J.K. 2004. Catalog of Recent and fossil turrids (Mollusca: Gastropoda). Zootaxa 682: 1–1295
 Steyn, D.G & Lussi, M. (2005). Offshore Shells of Southern Africa: A pictorial guide to more than 750 Gastropods. Published by the authors. Pp. i–vi, 1–289.
 Cernohorsky, Walter O. "Taxonomic notes on some deep-water Turridae (Mollusca: Gastropoda) from the Malagasy Republic." Records of the Auckland Institute and Museum (1987): 123–134.
 Liu, J.Y. [Ruiyu] (ed.). (2008). Checklist of marine biota of China seas. China Science Press. 1267 pp.
 Li B. [Baoquan] & Li X. [Xinzheng]. (2008). Report on the turrid genera Gemmula, Lophiotoma and Ptychosyrinx (Gastropoda: Turridae: Turrinae) from the China seas. Zootaxa. 1778: 1-25.

External links
  Tucker, J.K. 2004 Catalog of recent and fossil turrids (Mollusca: Gastropoda). Zootaxa 682:1-1295.

kieneri
Gastropods described in 1840